Il Marchese del Grillo ("The Marquess Del Grillo", internationally released as The Marquis of Grillo) is a 1981 Italian comedic motion picture directed by Mario Monicelli, starring Alberto Sordi as the title character. The film depicts early nineteenth-century episodes in the life of a nobleman in Rome. Loosely based on folkloric accounts of the real Onofrio del Grillo (who lived in the eighteenth century), this character plays a number of pranks, one even involving Pope Pius VII. The famous line Io sò io, e voi non siete un cazzo (literally "I am who I am, and you are fucking nobody"), is appropriated from Belli's 1831 sonnet, "The Sovrans of the Old World".

Plot
Rome, Year of our Lord 1809. The Pope Pius VII with his cardinals and ministers manages both temporal and spiritual power of the Papal States in Italy. The Marquis Onofrio del Grillo is one of his favorites, but even the worst of all the nobility. As a privileged and protected nobleman, Onofrio feels free to play his pranks on the poor people without any fear of the consequences. On one occasion, when he is arrested at a dinner with common criminals, he turns to the populace in a vulgar speech, claiming that his nobility allows him to do what he wants, and that they, being poor, are not worth anything. Memorable is the dispute between the poor Jew Aronne Piperno and the Marquis for the payment of a salary. Aaron is amazed when Onofrio refuses to pay with the argument that his creditor being a Jew is a murderer of Jesus. Aaron brings his case to court, but Onofrio wins the lawsuit by corrupting the judges and the cardinals. Piperno is condemned and mocked by the people, and Onofrio announces to the Pope that justice has just died in his States.

In the meantime the Pope has the French Emperor Napoleon Bonaparte excommunicated. When the conflict escalates, Onofrio is appointed commander of the Swiss Guards in Castel Sant'Angelo. He does not take the situation very seriously, and ultimately fails in his task to defend the Papal palace. While he is leaving command to check on the fidelity of a young plebeian lover of his, the French guards enter the Holy See to arrest the Pope. Onofrio has personally few prejudices and quickly includes acquaintances from the new order within his circle, becoming friends with a young commander of the French regiment as well as more senior officers. This is however much to the disappointment of his pious mother who claims that the French, as enemies of the Pope King, are also sworn enemies of God.

With the French occupants a theater company also arrives from Paris, introducing the novelty of real women for female roles. Due to the obtuseness of the Roman people the show proves a failure, but Onofrio takes the chance to start an affair with the beautiful and free spirited singer Olympia. One night, while walking around the ruins of the Forum to find a suitable spot for sleeping together, they notice a drunken coalman who is a perfect sosia of the Marquis. Onofrio decides to play one of his jokes by switching roles. He instructs his servant to have the unconscious man dressed up as himself, while he will play the part of Gasperino the coalman. The next morning the poor drunkard wakes up in Onofrio's bed to find himself transformed into a marquis. His bad manners lead the family to believe that he is possessed by the spirit of a dead coalman, and Onofrio's uncle tries to have him exorcised. After the first shock Gasperino starts to adapt to his new role and some of his family find him even better than the real Marquis. But when the Pope returns after Napoleon's defeat he has Onofrio condemned and Gasperino risks to end his life under the guillotine.

Cast
Alberto Sordi ... Onofrio Del Grillo / Gasperino the coalman
Giorgio Gobbi ... Ricciotto, servant
Paolo Stoppa ... Pope Pius VII
Caroline Berg ... Olympia, French singer
Jacques Herlin ... Étienne Radet, French general
Marc Porel ... Capitaine Blanchard, French commander
Flavio Bucci ... Don Bastiano, chief of the brigands
Riccardo Billi ... Aronne Piperno, cabinet maker
Elena Daskowa Valenzano ... Marchesa del Grillo, mother
Isabelle Linnartz ... Genuflessa del Grillo, cousin
Marina Confalone ... Camilla del Grillo, sister
Cochi Ponzoni ... Conte Rambaldo, brother-in-law
Andrea Bevilacqua ... Pompeo, nephew
Pietro Tordi ... Mons. Terenzio del Grillo, uncle
Leopoldo Trieste ... Don Sabino, chaplain
Tommaso Bianco ... Administrator
Angela Campanella ... Faustina, concubine
Elena Fiore ... Anita, Faustina's mother
Gianni Di Pinto ... Marcuccio, Faustina's lover
Elisa Mainardi ... Gasperino's wife
Isabella De Bernardi ... Gasperino's daughter
Camillo Milli ... Cardinal Secretary of the Pontifical States
Giovanni Febbraro ... Pontifical commissioner
Salvatore Jacono ... Bargello, Pontifical constable
Paolo Paoloni ... Captain of the Swiss Guards

Awards
The film won two David di Donatello, four Nastri d'Argento in 1982. At the 32nd Berlin International Film Festival Mario Monicelli won the Silver Bear for Best Director.

References

External links

1981 films
1980s historical comedy films
Italian historical comedy films
1980s Italian-language films
Films set in Rome
Films set in the 1800s
Films directed by Mario Monicelli
Films scored by Nicola Piovani
1980s Italian films